André Pousse (20 October 1919 – 9 September 2005) was a noted French actor and, in his youth, also a notable cyclist.

Biography

While primarily known as a leading French actor, André Pousse began his professional career as a cyclist (primarily track). His greatest cycling achievements took place in the infamous Vél d'Hiv (Vélodrome d'Hiver or Winter Velodrome), in Paris, where he won the prestigious "six days of Vél d'Hiv" races from 1942 to 1949. Indeed, Pousse is the record holder in this event, and will remain so as the Vél d'Hiv has since been torn down. The "race," as it was, took place in front of 20,000 spectators and was a major French cultural and sporting event. It lasted six days and nights and, until two-man teams were established, it was apt to land exhausted participants in hospital, as Pousse himself remarked. Alain Delon, who as a child attended the races as an ardent admirer of Pousse, remembers competing with other children for the honor of bringing Pousse his bicycle at the beginning of a race. André Pousse retired from the track in 1950; and later, from 1960, went on to his better known years as an actor in cinema and television. He played mostly gangster roles in police films of the time. For many years, he was the artistic director of the Moulin Rouge in Paris and many other establishments, including the Casino of Lebanon. He also served as the agent of many French actors.

Selected filmography

D'où viens-tu, Johnny? (1963) - M. Franck
 (1966) - Un truand en fuite
 An Idiot in Paris (1967) - Le chauffeur de taxi
 (1967) - Albert Roza
Max le débonnaire (1967, TV Series) - (segment "De quoi je me mêle")
 (1968) - Quinquin
Leontine  (1968) - Fred
 (1968) - Barnabé
 A Golden Widow (1969) - Pierre Déricourt de Savignac dit Pierrot le Farceur
Le Clan des Siciliens (1969) - Malik
Des vacances en or (1969) - Constant
Trop petit mon ami (1970) - L'inspecteur Terrell
Tumuc Humac (1970) - Bréchet
 (1971) - Gi
Le Drapeau noir flotte sur la marmite (1971) - Balloche
Elle cause plus, elle flingue (1972) - Max
Un flic (1972) - Marc Albouis
Quelques messieurs trop tranquilles (1973) - Gérard
 (1973) - Milan
Au théâtre ce soir (1973, TV Series) - Crochard
Profession: Aventuriers (1973) - Le juge
 (1974) - Charles Laurent
Bons baisers... à lundi (1974) - L'automobiliste (uncredited)
Flic Story (1975) - Jean-Baptiste Buisson
Bons Baisers de Hong Kong (1975) - René
Attention les yeux! (1976) - Rotberger
Oublie-moi, Mandoline (1976) - Eugène de Charonne
Chantons sous l'Occupation (1976, Documentary) - Himself
Drôles de Zèbres (1977) - L'homme de mauvais conseil
Le Cœur froid (1977) - Le docteur
La Septième compagnie au clair de lune (1977) - Lambert
 (1978, TV Series) - L'inspecteur Bastiani
Le Sacrifice (1978, TV Movie) - Sydney
Les Égouts du paradis (1979) - Le chauve
Le Corbillard de Jules (1982) - M. Lucien
Mettez du sel sur la queue de l'oiseau pour l'attraper (1982, TV Movie) - Hubert de Caffagnac
Deux heures moins le quart avant Jésus-Christ (1982) - Un centurion
Le Privé (1986, TV Series) - Rino
Paparoff se dédouble (1988-1990, TV Series) - M. Robert
Le Retour de Lemmy Caution (1989, TV Movie) - Le commissaire Schmidt
Cluedo (1994-1995, TV Series) - Colonel Moutarde
Requiem pour un con damné (1994, Short)
Moi j'aime Albert (1996, Short) - Albert
En panne (1996, Short)
Opération Bugs Bunny (1997, TV Movie)
Deux bananes flambées et l'addition (1998, Short) - Lambert
L'Âme-sœur (1999) - Archbishop Lacaze
 (1999) - Le Faucheur
Qui mange quoi? (2002, TV Movie) - Etienne
 (2003, TV Series) - Paul Pontevecchio
Le Plein des sens (2004, Short)
Qui mange quand? (2004, TV Movie) - Étienne, dit 'Le tatoué' (uncredited) (final film role)

Written works
 J'balance pas, j'raconte (autobiography with Laurent Chollet) (2005)
 Histoires sur le pouce (2001)
 Touchez pas aux souvenirs (1989)

External links
 

1919 births
2005 deaths
Road incident deaths in France
French male film actors
French male television actors